Agency Township is a township in Roberts County, South Dakota, United States. The township is part of the Lake Traverse Reservation, which is home to the Sisseton Wahpeton Oyate Indian tribe. The tribe's headquarters at Agency Village are in the township, as is Sisseton Wahpeton College.

Demographics
As of the 2000 Census, there were 277 people, 83 households, and 70 families residing in the township. There were 98 housing units total. The racial makeup of the city was 71.8% Native American, 26.0% White, and 2.2% from two or more races.

References

Townships in Roberts County, South Dakota
Townships in South Dakota
Sisseton Wahpeton Oyate